The 1978 French motorcycle Grand Prix was the fourth round of the 1978 Grand Prix motorcycle racing season. It took place on the weekend of 5–7 May 1978 at the Circuit de Nogaro.

Classification

500 cc

350cc

250cc

125cc

Sidecar classification

References

French motorcycle Grand Prix
French
Motorcycle Grand Prix